Puddingstone may refer to:

Puddingstone (rock), a type of sedimentary rock
Puddingstone Park, a park in Boston, Massachusetts
Lake Puddingstone, a lake in Los Angeles County, California
Puddingstone Rock, a small islet in New Zealand's Otago Harbour